The term caixa 2 or  are terms used in Brazil, and Portugal respectively, to refer to a type of slush fund involving unrecorded funds not reported to the appropriate supervisory tax organisms.  Among the caixa dois crimes, money laundering and organized crime are within the scope of the Supreme Federal Court. Caixa dois is used by some companies that fail to issue required invoices or issue them with a lower value than the transaction that actually occurred, reducing their tax liability. By declaring a reduced value of the invoices to the tax authority, less tax is paid to the treasury. The amount held back and not paid, is "cashbox two", the portion "forgotten" by the financial accounting department of the enterprise.

See also 

 Operation Car Wash

References

External links 

 Legislação brasileira traduzida para o Inglêsofficial English translations of the Constitution, and dozens of other Brazilian laws

Politics of Brazil
Political corruption

pt:Caixa dois